2012-13 Professional Arena Soccer League (PASL) season is the fifth season for the American indoor soccer league. The season started on November 1, 2012, and ended on February 23, 2013. This season, the league expanded to 19 teams divided into four divisions.

Standings
As of February 23, 2013 

(Bold) Division Winner

Statistics

Top scorers
Last updated on February 23, 2013. Source: PASL Statistics - Total Points

2013 Ron Newman Cup

Playoff format
Each of the four divisions pitted their first and second-place teams against one another in a home-and-home format. A 30-minute mini-game would have been held immediately after Game 2 if the series was tied at one win apiece. The Semi-Final and Championship games were single elimination and hosted by the San Diego Sockers, the team with the best regular season record. The Semi-Finals were held on Sunday, March 10, 2013, with the Championship game the following day, Monday, March 11, 2013.

Bracket

Schedule

Divisional Finals Leg 1

Divisional Finals Leg 2

Semi-Finals

Championship

Awards

Player of the Week

Individual Awards

All-League First Team

All-League Second Team

References

 
Professional Arena Soccer League
Professional Arena Soccer League
Professional Arena Soccer League seasons